Moon of Avellaneda (also known as Avellaneda's Moon in English) is a 2004 Argentine comedy-drama film directed by Juan José Campanella, and written by Campanella, Fernando Castets and Juan Pablo Domenech. The film stars Ricardo Darín in his third collaboration with Campanella and Eduardo Blanco in his fourth collaboration, as well as Mercedes Morán and Valeria Bertuccelli.

Plot
Román Maldonado (Ricardo Darín) was born during a carnival fair held at "Luna de Avellaneda", a sports and social club located in Avellaneda, Buenos Aires province. He is made a member for life, and the club becomes a central part of his life.

The club used to have over 8,000 members in its heyday, but in the 2000s membership has dwindled to some 300. The neighbourhood is decaying, the surviving inhabitants are struggling financially and gatherings are hardly what they used to be. To top things off, Román discovers his wife Verónica is having an affair, and their marriage finds itself at its worst.

Together with Amadeo Grimberg (Eduardo Blanco) and Graciela (Mercedes Morán), friends from the club, he must fight for the survival of the place before it is sold off and turned into a casino.

The film chronicles the ups and downs of this fight, as well as Amadeo's struggling relationship with Cristina (Valeria Bertuccelli), Román's family crisis and the difficulties Graciela has after her husband leaves. In the end, a vote to keep the club alive is defeated 33 to 26, and the main characters find themselves parting ways in a bittersweet manner. The ending is however upbeat, as Román finds hope in finding his old club membership card, and together with Amadeo hints that they will start a new one.

Cast
 Ricardo Darín as Román Maldonado
 Eduardo Blanco as Amadeo Grimberg
 Mercedes Morán as Graciela
 Valeria Bertuccelli as Cristina
 Silvia Kutika as Verónica
 José Luis López Vázquez as Don Aquiles
 Daniel Fanego as Alejandro
 Atilio Pozzobon as Atilio
 Horacio Peña as Julio
 María Victoria Biscay as Macarena
 Francisco Fernández De Rosa as Darío
 Micaela Moreno as Dalma
 Alan Sabbagh as Ismael
 Sofia Bertolotto as Yanina, Dario's girlfriend
 Ezequiel Merlino as Bruno

Awards
 Clarin Entertainment Awards: Clarin Award, Best Supporting Actor - Film (Cine: Mejor Actor de reparto), Eduardo Blanco; 2004.
 Havana Film Festival: Coral, Sound, José Luis Díaz; 2004.

Nominations
 Goya Awards: Goya, Best Spanish Language Foreign Film (Mejor Película Extranjera de Habla Hispana), Juan José Campanella, Argentina; 2004.

Inspiration
The film is inspired by a real club, the "Club Juventud Unida de Llavallol" of Buenos Aires, in which much of its scenes were filmed and also in real situations that occurred at the time of the 2001 Argentina crisis, that are represented in the film as everyday dramas suffered by a society which purchasing power and subsistence collapsed when incomes were not enough to pay even for basic services (gas, water, electricity), while the club struggles, trying to resist, against the onslaught of the debt-burdened economy.

References

External links
 
 Moon of Avellaneda at Cinenacional 
 Moon of Avellaneda film review by Josefina Sartora at Cineismo 
 

2004 films
2004 comedy-drama films
Argentine comedy-drama films
Films directed by Juan José Campanella
Argentine independent films
2000s Spanish-language films
Films shot in Buenos Aires
Films set in Buenos Aires
2004 comedy films
2004 drama films
2004 independent films
2000s Argentine films